Procopius of Scythopolis (died 7 July AD 303) was a 4th century martyr who is venerated as a saint. He was a reader and exorcist in the church at Scythopolis; he also was famous as an ascetic and erudite theologian. Eusebius of Caesarea wrote of his martyrdom, which occurred during the persecution of Roman Emperor Diocletian, and stated that "he was born at Jerusalem, but had gone to live in Scythopolis, where he held three ecclesiastical offices. He was reader and interpreter in the Syriac language, and cured those possessed of evil spirits." Eusebius wrote that Procopius was sent with his companions from Scythopolis to Caesarea Maritima, where he was decapitated.

Accounts
Eusebius's account of Procopius's martyrdom also exists in medieval Syriac, Georgian, and Latin translations. Later legendary and contradictory accounts claimed that he was either a soldier saint, ascetic, a Persian, or prince of Alexandria.  One myth claimed that he slew around 6,000 barbarian invaders simply by showing them the cross. Another account, clearly borrowed off of the life of the Apostle St. Paul of Tarsus, claimed that he was a persecutor of Christians originally named Neanias whom Roman Emperor Diocletian appointed as duke of Alexandria, Egypt; on the way from Antioch, Neanias experienced a vision and declared himself to be a Christian.

Veneration
In Western Europe, Procopius was first enumerated in the calendar of saints by St. Bede, whose Martyrology listed the saint under 8 July. His name and date were added to the Roman Martyrology.

In Scythopolis a chapel was dedicated in honor of him. In Caesarea Maritima Roman Emperor Zeno erected a church dedicated in honor of him in AD 484.  His relics were translated to the Church of Saint Michael in Antioch, Syria. In Constantinople 4 churches were dedicated in his honor. He is the patron saint of Niš, Serbia.

In the Eastern Orthodox Church, he is remembered in the marriage dismissal.

See also
 Cyril of Scythopolis

Notes

External links
"St. Procopius, Martyr", Butler's Lives of the Saints
Greatmartyr Procopius of Caesarea, in Palestine Orthodox icon and synaxarion for July 8
Saints of July 8: Procopius of Scythopolis
 San Procopio di Cesarea di Palestina

303 deaths
4th-century Christian martyrs
4th-century Romans
Saints from the Holy Land
Catholic exorcists
People executed by decapitation
Year of birth unknown
Military saints
Great Martyrs
People from Beit She'an
Christians martyred during the reign of Diocletian